Mariem Hassan con Leyoad is a 2002 collective album by Mariem Hassan and the Sahrawi group Leyoad.

Track listing

References 

2002 debut albums
Mariem Hassan albums
Collaborative albums
Arabic-language albums